Likhit Namsen (born ) is a retired Thai female volleyball player.

She was part of the Thailand women's national volleyball team at the 1998 FIVB Volleyball Women's World Championship in Japan.

References

1972 births
Living people
Likhit Namsen
Place of birth missing (living people)
Likhit Namsen
Likhit Namsen